The Nordic regional group (formerly NORDEL) of ENTSO-E is a synchronous electrical grid composed of the electricity grids of Norway, Sweden, Finland and the eastern part of electricity sector in Denmark (Zealand with islands and Bornholm). The grid is not synchronized with the Synchronous grid of Continental Europe, but has a number of non-synchronous DC connections with that as well as other synchronous grids. Gotland is not synchronized with the Swedish mainland either, as it is connected by HVDC.

DC Links
The Nordic system is connected to other synchronous areas by these links:
NordLink, Norway to Germany
Konti-Skan, Sweden-West Denmark Jutland
Skagerrak, western Denmark (Jutland) - Norway
Great Belt Power Link, Western Denmark (Jutland) - Eastern Denmark
Baltic Cable, Sweden to Germany
SwePol, Sweden to Poland
NordBalt, Sweden to Lithuania
NorNed, Norway to the Netherlands
North Sea Link Norway to the UK
Estlink, Finland to Estonia 
Kontek, eastern Denmark to Germany

References

 
Electric power transmission systems in Europe
Electric power in the European Union
Northern Europe
Nordic countries